The Serbian Liberation Committee of the Sanjak of Niš, known as the Niš Committee was a Serb revolutionary organisation (national liberation movement) based in Niš, established in 1874, with the aim of not only liberating Niš and its immediate surroundings, but also the whole of the Sanjak of Niš, including Leskovac, Pirot, Vranje, Breznica, and Tran, from the hands of the Ottoman Empire.

Background
Serbian Revolution
1832/1833 uprisings in Serbia, whose nahija were merged into the Principality of Serbia
Niš rebellion (1841)
Serb revolutionary organizations

History

On February 24, 1874, the "Serbian Liberation Committee for the Sanjak of Niš", known simply as the Niš Committee, was founded and organized by Kole Rašić, Todor Milovanović, Dimitrije Đorđević, Milan Novičić, Tasko Tasa Uzunović, Đorđe Pop-Manić, Mihajlo Božidarac, and Todor Stanković. They gathered at Božidarac's house, and Orthodox priest Petar Ikonomović swore Oath on the Christian cross and Gospel, reminiscent of the Orašac Assembly (1804). Rašić was declared vojvoda.

Aftermath
Kumanovo Uprising

See also
Serb revolutionary organizations

References

Sources

Nacionalno politička akcija Nišlija za oslobođenje 1860-1877 U:Istorija Niša I, strana 297–304, Gradina i Prosveta Niš, 1983.

Serbian revolutionary organizations
Organizations established in 1874
19th-century establishments in Serbia
History of Niš
Pirot District
1874 establishments in the Ottoman Empire
1878 disestablishments
Ottoman Serbia
Serbs from the Ottoman Empire
Revolutionary organizations against the Ottoman Empire